Great Expectations is a 1934 adaptation of the 1861 Charles Dickens novel of the same name.  Filmed with mostly American actors, it was the first sound version of the novel and was produced in Hollywood by Universal Studios and directed by Stuart Walker. It stars Phillips Holmes as Pip, Jane Wyatt as Estella and Florence Reed as Miss Havisham.

Critics consider this 1934 version far inferior to the classic 1946 version, made in England and directed by David Lean. A notable link between the two movies is that Francis L. Sullivan played the role of Jaggers in both.

This film differs somewhat from the novel in making Miss Havisham more eccentric than insane. Unlike the novel, she does not wear her bridal veil constantly, does not seem to have really engineered all of Pip's misfortunes with Estella, and dies offscreen of natural causes rather than in a fire.

Plot summary

Cast
 Henry Hull as Abel Magwitch
 Phillips Holmes as Pip
 Jane Wyatt as Estella
 Florence Reed as Miss Havisham
 Alan Hale as Joe Gargery
 Rafaela Ottiano as  Mrs. Joe Gargery
 George Barraud as Compeyson
 Francis L. Sullivan as Mr. Jaggers
 Douglas Wood as Wopsle 
 Forrester Harvey as Uncle Pumblechook
 George P. Breakston as Pip, as a Child 
 Harry Cording as Orlick 
 Eily Malyon as Sarah Pocket (billed as Eily Malyan)
 Anne Howard as Estella, as a Child
 Walter Armitage as Herbert Pocket 
 Walter Brennan as Prisoner on Ship (uncredited)

References

External links
 
 
 
 

American historical films
American black-and-white films
Films based on Great Expectations
Films directed by Stuart Walker
1930s historical films
Films set in London
Films set in England
Films set in the 19th century
Films scored by Edward Ward (composer)
1930s English-language films
1930s American films
Films produced by Carl Laemmle Jr.